Nas: Time Is Illmatic is a 2014 documentary film directed by One9 and produced by One9, Erik Parker and Anthony Saleh. The film recounts the circumstances leading up to Nas' 1994 debut album Illmatic. Released on the 20th anniversary of Illmatic, the film includes interviews with Nas, his brother and father, and figures from the East Coast hip hop scene. Nas: Time Is Illmatic premiered during the opening night of the 2014 Tribeca Film Festival, on April 16, 2014. The project received a grant from Tribeca All Access and additional funding from the Ford Foundation.

Reception
Nas: Time Is Illmatic received positive reviews from most critics. The film's Metacritic score is 72/100 based on 14 critical reviews, and its Rotten Tomatoes score is 100%, with an average rating of 7.38/10 based on 38 reviews. The documentary was a recipient of a Candescent Award. Nas: Time Is Illmatic was considered by Variety magazine to be a likely contender to be nominated for the Academy Award for Best Documentary Feature, but did not receive a nomination.

See also
 East Coast hip hop
 Illmatic
 List of films with a 100% rating on Rotten Tomatoes

References

External links
 
 
 
 
 

2014 documentary films
American documentary films
Documentary films about hip hop music and musicians
Nas
2010s English-language films
2010s American films